Dean Edmund Haspiel (born May 31, 1967 in New York City) is an American comic book artist, writer, and playwright. He is known for creating Billy Dogma, The Red Hook, and for his collaborations with writer Harvey Pekar on his American Splendor series as well as the graphic novel The Quitter, and for his collaborations with Jonathan Ames on The Alcoholic and HBO's Bored to Death. He has been nominated for numerous Eisner Awards, and won a 2010 Emmy Award for TV design work.

Early life
Haspiel grew up on Manhattan's Upper West Side and attended The High School of Music & Art/Fiorello H. LaGuardia High School, graduating in 1985.

In the mid-1980s, Haspiel worked at Upstart Associates (a shared studio space on West 29th Street in New York City) as an assistant for Howard Chaykin on American Flagg! and for Walter Simonson on Thor; he also worked (at a different studio) as an assistant for Bill Sienkiewicz on New Mutants and Elektra: Assassin. Later, Haspiel attended the State University of New York at Purchase, first majoring in illustration and eventually switching to film.

Career 

In 1987, while still an undergraduate, Haspiel inaugurated his professional comics career when he co-created The Verdict with Martin Powell. Haspiel went on to co-create the two-man comics anthology Keyhole with cartoonist Josh Neufeld (a fellow graduate of LaGuardia High School).

Haspiel's "last romantic anti-hero" Billy Dogma made his comic book debut in Keyhole, and has appeared in a number of comics and graphic novels  since then, published by Top Shelf Productions and Alternative Comics. Recent works starring Billy Dogma include Brawl, a "creature romance double feature" mini-series with Michel Fiffe for Image Comics; and "Sex Planet," a Billy Dogma interlude for Popgun volume 2 (also published by Image).

Haspiel was a long-time collaborator with Harvey Pekar on American Splendor. The culmination of their work together was the 104-page nonfiction graphic novel The Quitter, published by Vertigo in 2005.

In 2006 Haspiel spearheaded the foundation of ACT-I-VATE, a webcomics collective which featured the works of founding members Haspiel, Dan Goldman, Nick Bertozzi, Michel Fiffe, Leland Purvis, Nikki Cook, Tim Hamilton, and Josh Neufeld. (In 2009, IDW Publishing published the ACT-I-VATE Primer, which featured an original Haspiel story as well as work by other members of the collective.)

In fall 2008, Vertigo released the original graphic novel The Alcoholic, written by Jonathan Ames and drawn by Haspiel. Also in 2008, Françoise Mouly's Toon Books published Mo and Jo: Fighting Together Forever, written by Jay Lynch and drawn by Haspiel. In 2008, Haspiel serialized Street Code, a webcomic for Zuda Comics, after editing the webcomics anthology Next-Door Neighbor for SMITH Magazine.

In 2010, IDW/Graphic NYC Presents published the monograph Dean Haspiel: The Early Years, by writer Christopher Irving. That same year, Haspiel illustrated Inverna Lockpez's Cuba: My Revolution, published by Vertigo. The book was covered by, among others, NPR's Tell Me More, the New York Post, and Graphic Novel Reporter. Also in 2010, Haspiel won an Emmy Award for outstanding main title design for the HBO show Bored to Death.

In 2011, Haspiel helped spearhead the creation of Trip City, "a Brooklyn-filtered, multimedia, literary arts salon featuring free regular exclusive content created by a fellowship of 21st Century auteurs." For a period, it was the online home of new Haspiel comics and postings.

Since 2016, Haspiel has been writing and drawing the serialized webcomic The Red Hook, about a master thief living in the "New Brooklyn Universe," for Webtoon.

In 2019, Haspiel and long-time collaborator Josh Neufeld launched a weekly podcast, Scene by Scene with Josh & Dean, that focused on Harvey Pekar and the American Splendor movie.

Bibliography

Comics

Creator series/graphic novels 
 The Verdict, 4-issue miniseries co-created with writer Martin Powell (Eternity Comics, 1987)
 Keyhole, shared with Josh Neufeld (1996–1998)
 #1–4 (Millennium Publications, 1996–1997)
 #5–6 (Top Shelf Productions, 1998)
 Billy Dogma #1–3 (Millennium Publications, 1997)
 SLC Punk! written by James Merendino (Straight Edge Productions/Lulu Publishing, 1999)
 Daydream Lullabies (Top Shelf Productions, 1999)
 Opposable Thumbs (Alternative Comics, 2001) 
 Boy In My Pocket (Top Shelf Productions, 2003) 
 The Thing: Night Falls on Yancy Street, 4-issue miniseries with writer Evan Dorkin (Marvel Comics, 2003)
 Aim To Dazzle (Alternative Comics, 2004)
 The Quitter with writer Harvey Pekar (Vertigo, 2005)
 Immortal webcomic (Act-i-vate, 2006)
 Brawl, 3-issue miniseries shared with Michel Fiffe (Image Comics, 2007)
 Fear, My Dear webcomic (Act-i-vate, 2007)
 The Alcoholic with writer Jonathan Ames (Vertigo, 2008)
 Mo and Jo: Fighting Together Forever with writer Jay Lynch (Toon Books, 2008)
 Street Code webcomic (Zuda Comics, 2008)
 Next-Door Neighbor webcomics anthology, editor (Smith Magazine, 2008)
 Cuba: My Revolution with writer Inverna Lockpez (Vertigo, 2010)
 The Last Mortician webcomic with writer Tim Hall (Tor.com, 2011)
 The Fox: Freak Magnet with writers Mark Waid and J. M. DeMatteis (Archie Comics, 2014)
 Beef with Tomato (Alternative Comics, 2015)
 The Fox: Fox Hunt with writer Mark Waid (Archie Comics, 2018)
 The Red Hook Volume 1: New Brooklyn (Image Comics, 2018)
 The Red Hook Volume 2: War Cry (Image Comics, 2019)

Stories/comics elsewhere 
 Detective Comics #589, 14-page story titled "Bonus Book #5: For the Love of Ivy" with writers Lewis Klahr & Steve Piersall (DC Comics, 1988)
 Justice League International #24, 14-page story titled "Bonus Book #13: Maxwell Lord" with writer David Levin (DC Comics, 1989)
 Caliber Presents #s 16–21, story titled "The Verdict: The Acolyte" with writer Martin Powell (Caliber Comics, 1990)
 Negative Burn #27, 1-page story titled "Lionel's Lament" (Caliber Comics, 1995)
 Negative Burn #28, 1-page story titled "Lionel's Lament" with cartoonist Josh Neufeld (Caliber Comics, 1995)
 Negative Burn #32, 1-page story titled "You're Lying To Me" (Caliber Comics, 1996)
 Negative Burn #33, 2-page story titled "American Dilemma" starring Harvey Pekar (Caliber Comics, 1995)
 SPX '97 anthology, "Lucky Love Limbo" with Jessica Abel (CBLDF, 1997)
 Minimum Wage #10 anthology, 6-page story titled "Open" (Fantagraphics, 1999)
 SPX '99 anthology, 2-page story titled "Buster Browns" (CBLDF, 1999)
 Day of Judgment: Secret Files, "Dr. Fate" pin-up (DC Comics, 1999)
 American Splendor: Terminal anthology, 1-page story titled "Violation" with writer Harvey Pekar (Dark Horse Comics, 1999)
 American Splendor: Bedtime Stories anthology, 1-page story titled "The Good Times Are Gone" with writer Harvey Pekar (Dark Horse Comics, 2000)
 American Splendor: Portrait of the Author In His Declining Years anthology, 5-page story titled "Payback" with writer Harvey Pekar (Dark Horse Comics, 2001)
 Expo 2001 anthology, 4-page story titled "The Big To Do" (CBLDF, 2001)
 Bizarro Comics anthology, 7-page story titled "Captain Marvel and the Sham Shazam" with writer Sam Henderson (DC Comics, 2001)
 9–11: Emergency Relief anthology, 6-page story titled "91101" (Alternative Comics, 2002)
 Captain America: Red, White & Blue with writer Karl Bollers (Marvel Comics, 2002)
 Muties #3 with writer Karl Bollers (Marvel Comics, 2002)
 writer for Johnny Bravo in Cartoon Cartoons #12 (DC Comics, 2002)
 JLA-Z, Despero pin-up (DC Comics, 2003)
 X-Men Unlimited #40 anthology 12-page story titled "Slam" with writer Nick Bertozzi (Marvel Comics, 2003)
 Spider-Man's Tangled Web #20 with writer Zeb Wells (Marvel Comics, 2003)
 Alternative Comics #1, anthology, 4-page story titled "Aim to Dazzle" (Alternative Comics, 2003)
 The Amazing Adventures of the Escapist #3 with writer Kevin McCarthy (Dark Horse Comics, 2003)
 Batman Adventures #9 (reprinted in Batman Adventures: Shadows & Masks) with writers Gabe Soria and Vito Delsante (DC Comics, 2004)
 Justice League Adventures #32 with writer Keith Giffen (DC Comics, 2004)
 Alternative Comics #2, anthology, 1-page story titled "Identity Crisis" with writer Harvey Pekar (Alternative Comics, 2004)
 The Amazing Adventures of the Escapist #8 titled "Escape From the Hospital" with writer Harvey Pekar (Dark Horse Comics, 2005)
 Project: Superior anthology, co-edited with Scott Morse and Chris Pitzer (AdHouse Books, 2005)
 Alternative Comics #3, anthology, 1-page story titled "Funny You Should Ask!" (Alternative Comics, 2005)
 Bizarro World anthology, 5-page story titled "Bizarro Shmizarro" with writer Harvey Pekar (DC Comics, 2005)
 SPIN, 2-page story titled "Rock, Roll 'n' Randle" written by Harvey Pekar (2005)
 Playboy, 2-page story titled "The Real Harvey" written by Harvey Pekar (2005)
 SPIN, 1-page story titled "The Black Eyed Peas Storm Sting's Castle" written by will.i.am and Kyle Anderson (2005)
 writer of Cartoon Network Block Party! #16 (DC Comics, 2006)
 Beowulf #7 (Fallout, Pt. 1) with writer Vito Delsante (Speakeasy Comics, 2006)
 American Splendor #1 anthology, 20-page story titled "The Day's Highlights" with writer Harvey Pekar (Vertigo, 2006)
 American Splendor #2 anthology, 7-page story titled "Today I am a Man" with writer Harvey Pekar (Vertigo, 2006)
 American Splendor #3 anthology, 4-page story titled "The Battle of the Vacant Lot" with writer Harvey Pekar (Vertigo, 2006)
 American Splendor #4 anthology, 8-page story titled "New York City Signing" with writer Harvey Pekar (Vertigo, 2007)
 Goosebumps Graphix #3: Scary Summer, story titled "The Revenge of the Lawn Gnomes" adapted from writer R. L. Stine (GRAPHIX, 2007)
 Vampirella #8 with writer Brian Wood (Harris Comics, 2008)
 Popgun vol 2. anthology, story titled "Sex Planet" (Image Comics, 2008)
 American Splendor: Season Two anthology #1, 1-page story titled "Hollywood Bob's Observation" with writer Harvey Pekar (Vertigo, 2008)
 American Splendor: Season Two anthology #2, 2-page story titled "Brought Up Short" with writer Harvey Pekar (Vertigo, 2008)
 American Splendor: Season Two anthology #3, 9-page story titled "Bop Philosophy" with writer Harvey Pekar (Vertigo, 2008)
 American Splendor: Season Two anthology #4, 5-page story titled "Cleopatra" with writer Harvey Pekar (Vertigo, 2008)
 ACT-I-VATE Primer anthology, story titled "Bring Me the Heart of Billy Dogma" (IDW Publishing, 2009)
 Cyclops #1, 36-page story titled "The Bicycle Thief or: How Cyclops Got His Groove Back" with writer Lee Black (Marvel Comics, 2011)
 X-Men: First Class — Class Portraits anthology, story (Marvel Comics, 2011)
 Strange Tales II #2 anthology, story featuring Woodgod (Marvel Comics, 2011)
 The Amazing Spider-Man #692, 8-page story titled "Spider-Man For A Night" (Marvel Comics, 2012)

Illustrations
Dean Haspiel has contributed illustrations to the following projects:

 Video King, Mummy Monster Sign and The Scuzzbournes and various others for Nickelodeon Magazine
 Thor's Day for Shuttle Sheet magazine
 Pot Monkeys for High Times magazine
 various illustrations and covers for New York Press
 various illustrations and covers for The Austin Statesman American's XLent
 various illustrations and covers for Washington City Paper
 CD single cover for Cowboy Johnny Christ
 CD album cover for Yummy
 pin-up for David Yurkovich's Less Than Heroes graphic novel
 CD cover and 8pp comix foldout for comedian Mitch Fatel's Super Retardo

Film
Assistant director for Rockville Pictures' Burnzy's Last Call
Actor in McCann & Co. Films' Desolation Angels
Comics for Good Machine's Happiness
Production assistant for Good Machine's The Ice Storm
Actor in Next In Line Productions' Moby Presents: Alien Sex Party
Illustration for Good Machine's American Splendor
Comics for Red Mountain Film's Jail Bait
Illustrations for the HBO series Bored to Death

Theater
Playwright for Switch to Kill (2014)
Playwright for Harakiri Kane (aka Die! Die, Again!) (2017)— features Stoya
Playwright for The Last Bar at the End of the World (2018) — features Stoya, Seth Gilliam

Awards
 Ignatz Award nomination for Outstanding Comic (Keyhole) (1997)
 Eisner Award nomination for Talent Deserving of Wider Recognition (2002)
 Ignatz Award nomination for Outstanding Artist (2003)
 Eisner Award nomination for Best Webcomic (2008)
 Emmy Award outstanding main title design for Bored to Death (2010)
 Ringo Award best webcomic for The Red Hook (2017)

References

External links
 
 Dean Haspiel's blog
 Trip City
 ACT-I-VATE 
 Next-Door Neighbor on SMITH
 L.A. Times "Hero Complex" Interview
 Interview with Futureal Studio

American bloggers
Artists from New York City
Fiorello H. LaGuardia High School alumni
People from the Upper West Side
State University of New York at Purchase alumni
Alternative cartoonists
1967 births
Living people
American Splendor artists
American comics artists
American webcomic creators